Allison Joseph (born 1967) is an American poet, editor and professor. She is author of eight full-length poetry collections, most recently, Confessions of a Bare-Faced Woman (Red Hen Press, 2018).

Biography
Born in London, England, to parents of Jamaican heritage, Allison Joseph grew up in Toronto, Ontario, Canada, and the Bronx, New York. She graduated from Kenyon College with a B.A., and from Indiana University with an M.F.A. She teaches at Southern Illinois University Carbondale (SIUC), and is Director of the Young Writers Workshop at SIUC, which she founded in 1999: a four-day summer program for high school students. Many of SIUC's creative writing faculty and graduate students are involved with the workshop, and the student participants come from several states. In 1995, she was one of the founding editors of Crab Orchard Review as the magazine's poetry editor and has worked as editor-in-chief since August 2001. She is also the publisher and founder of No Chair Press. She lives in Carbondale, Illinois. Joseph will be teaching at the Poetry Seminar for The Frost Place in August 2021.

For more than thirty years, Joseph was married to fellow poet Jon Tribble, with whom she co-founded Crab Orchard Review. Tribble died in October 2019.

Honors and awards
 2020 Winner of the Independent Press Award, Small Book Category for Smart Pretender (Finishing Line Press, 2019)
 1992 John C. Zacharis First Book Award
 2009 Aquarius Press Legacy Award 
 Literary Award from the Illinois Arts Council
 Breadloaf Writers' Conference Fellowship
 Sewanee Writers' Conference Fellowship
 Academy of American Poets prize
 Ruth Lilly Fellowship
 Associated Writing Programs Prize

Published works

Full-length poetry collections

Confessions of a Barefaced Woman. Red Hen Press. 2018. .

Chapbook collections
The Last Human Heart. Diode Editions, 2020. .
Smart Pretender. Finishing Line Press, 2019. .
Corporal Muse. Sibling Rivalry Press, 2018. .

Anthology publications
 New Sister Voices: Poetry by American Women of African Descent

References

External links
 No Chair Press
 The Rondeau Roundup
"UNBLINKING" Interview with Allison Joseph by Marilyn Davis, Interview: Perspectives, Spring 2003.
"An Interview with Allison Joseph". Interview: Blackbird, January 13, 2006. 
Kendra Hamilton Interviews Allison Joseph, Callaloo, Volume 19, Number 2, Spring 1996, pp. 461–472
Poems: "Conservative Love in the Age of Obama", Starting Today, March 6, 2009
 Little Epiphanies by Allison Joseph. Poem: Valparisio Poetry Review
 Author Page: Mayapple Press - Allison Joseph
 [http://www.blackbird.vcu.edu/v4n1/features/joseph_a_061505/joseph_a_text.htm A Reading by Allison Joseph]. Audio Reading: Blackbird'' Archive.

1967 births
Living people
African-American poets
American women poets
Indiana University alumni
Kenyon College alumni
People from Carbondale, Illinois
British emigrants to Canada
Southern Illinois University Carbondale faculty
Writers from Illinois
Writers from New York City
Formalist poets
21st-century American poets
21st-century American women writers
21st-century African-American women writers
21st-century African-American writers
20th-century African-American people
20th-century African-American women